64th meridian may refer to:

64th meridian east, a line of longitude east of the Greenwich Meridian
64th meridian west, a line of longitude west of the Greenwich Meridian